François Fournier is a French politician, born on August 14, 1866 in Manduel (Gard) and died on May 27, 1941 in Manduel.

Mandates 
 Member of Parliament for the Gard région in France from 1901 to 1919

External links 
 His biographie on the site of the French parliament

1866 births
1941 deaths